Fabrizio Paolucci (2 April 1651 – 12 June 1726) was an Italian cardinal in the Roman Catholic Church, appointed by Pope Innocent XII.

Biography
Born at Forlì, he went to Rome at the age of eight, in 1659, to be educated by his grand-uncle, Francesco Paolucci. In 1685 he was elected bishop of Macerata and Tolentino, April 9, 1685, and later was appointed Nuncio in Cologne in 1696.
 
Pope Innocent XII elevated him to the rank of cardinal in the consistory of 19 December 1698, and he became archbishop of Ferrara. He became Cardinal Secretary of State during the pontificate of Pope Clement XI. On Clement's death, at the succeeding conclave of 1721, Paolucci was the strongest candidate to succeed, but was vetoed by Charles VI, Holy Roman Emperor as he considered him too close to the French. Instead Michelangelo Conti was elected as Pope Innocent XIII. After the latter's death in 1724 Paolucci was again one of the leading candidates for the papacy, but again the imperial veto played its part. However, with the election of Pope Benedict XIII, he resumed the role of Secretary of State and held the position until his death.

It was Paolucci who ordered the construction of the neoclassical Palazzo Paolucci de Calboli at Forlì.

He died on 12 June 1726 at the age of 75 years.

See also

Sources
Renata Ago, Carriere e clientele nella Roma barocca, Rome-Bari, Laterza, 1990.

 

1651 births
1726 deaths
People from Forlì
18th-century Italian cardinals
Cardinal Secretaries of State
Apostolic Nuncios to Cologne
Apostolic Nuncios to Germany